Cambarus speciosus, the beautiful crayfish, is a species of crayfish in the family Cambaridae. It is endemic to Georgia.

The IUCN conservation status of Cambarus speciosus is "NT", near threatened. The species may be considered threatened in the near future. The population is stable. This status was last reviewed in 2010.

References

Further reading

 
 
 

Cambaridae
Articles created by Qbugbot
Freshwater crustaceans of North America
Crustaceans described in 1981
Taxa named by Horton H. Hobbs Jr.
Endemic fauna of Georgia (U.S. state)